Frickley railway station was situated on the Swinton and Knottingley Joint railway, between Bolton-on-Dearne and Moorthorpe. It served the village of Clayton, South Yorkshire, England.

The station was situated about a mile north of the present Thurnscoe railway station.

It opened in 1879 and closed on 8 June 1953.

References 

 "A Railway Chronology of the Sheffield Area" Edited by Richard V. Proctor, Sheffield City Libraries, 1975.

External links
 Frickley station on navigable 1955 O. S. map
 Frickley station from approx 1902 on a navigable O. S. map

Disused railway stations in Barnsley
Former Swinton and Knottingley Joint Railway stations
Railway stations in Great Britain opened in 1879
Railway stations in Great Britain closed in 1953